Better Days may refer to:

Albums 
 Better Days (Guy Clark album) or the title song, 1983
 Better Days (Joe album) or the title song, 2001
 Better Days (Robbie Seay Band album) or the title song, 2005
 Better Days (Southside Johnny & The Asbury Jukes album) or the title song, 1991
 Better Days (Susan Tedeschi album) or the title song, 1995
 Better Days (Tom Dice album) or the title song (see below), 2018
 Better Days (EP) or the title song, by God Forbid, 2003
 Better Days, by the Bruisers, 2001
 Better Days, by Chuck Fenda, or the title song, 2005
 Better Days, by Edwin, 2006
 Better Days, by Paul Butterfield, 1973
 Better Days, by Tom Frager, 2009
 Better Dayz, by Tupac Shakur, or the title song, 2002

Songs
 "Better Days" (Baker Boy, Dallas Woods and Sampa the Great song), 2020
 "Better Days" (Bruce Springsteen song), 1992
 "Better Days" (Goo Goo Dolls song), 2005
 "Better Days" (Hedley song), 2017
 "Better Days" (Natalia Gutierrez y Angelo song), 2010
 "Better Days" (Neiked, Mae Muller and Polo G song), 2021
 "Better Days" (OneRepublic song), 2020
 "Better Days" (Pete Murray song), 2005
 "Better Days" (Tom Dice song), 2018
 "Better Days (And the Bottom Drops Out)", by Citizen King, 1999
 "Better Days", by Ant Clemons and Justin Timberlake, 2020
 "Better Days", by Badfinger from No Dice, 1970
 "Better Days", by Bekka & Billy, 1997
 "Better Days", by Breaking Benjamin from Shallow Bay: The Best of Breaking Benjamin, 2011
 "Better Days", by Depeche Mode, a B-side of the single "Suffer Well", 2006
 "Better Days", by Dermot Kennedy, 2021
 "Better Days", by Dianne Reeves from Dianne Reeves, 1987
 "Better Days", by Eddie Vedder from the soundtrack of the film Eat Pray Love, 2010
 "Better Days", by Edward Sharpe and the Magnetic Zeros from Edward Sharpe and the Magnetic Zeros, 2013
 "Better Days", by Elemeno P from Elemeno P, 2008
 "Better Days", by Emerson, Lake & Palmer from Black Moon, 1992
 "Better Days", by Graham Nash from Songs for Beginners, 1971
 "Better Days", by Gun from Taking On the World, 1989
 "Better Days", by Janet Jackson from All for You, 2001
 "Better Days", by Paul Doucette, 2004
 "Better Days", by Ringo Starr from What's My Name, 2019
 "Better Days", by Speech Debelle from Speech Therapy, 2009
 "Better Days", by Sum 41 from 13 Voices, 2016
 "Better Days", by Supertramp from Brother Where You Bound, 1985
 "Better Days", by TQ from They Never Saw Me Coming, 1998
 "Better Days", by Victoria Monét, 2016
 "Better Days", by the Wolfmen from Modernity Killed Every Night, 2008
 "Outside (Better Days)", by Blueface, 2021

Other 
 Better Days (film), a 2019 Chinese drama film
 Better Days (TV series), a 1986 American sitcom
 Serenity: Better Days, a 2008 comic book miniseries based on the TV series Firefly and the film Serenity

See also 
 Better Day (disambiguation)